() located in the Altona borough in the city Hamburg, Germany, is one of 104 quarters of Hamburg. In 2020, the population was 25,802.

Geography 

Demographics 
In 2006, in the quarter Altona-Nord were living 21,406 people. 15,1% were children under the age of 18, and 9,8% were 65 years of age or older. 22,9% were immigrants. 1689 people were registered as unemployed. In 1999, 55,1% of all households were made up of individuals.

Population by year 

In 2006, there were 3,314 criminal offences (155 crimes per 1,000 people).

Politics 
These are the results of Altona-Nord in the Hamburg state election:

Education 
In 2006, there were two elementary schools and four secondary schools in Altona-Nord.

Economy 

Holsten Brewery plc. is located in the quarter.

Culture 
Altona Nord is most famous in Hamburg for its musical theatre Neue Flora, which started by showing The Phantom of the Opera.

Infrastructure

Health systems 
23 physicians in private practice and four pharmacies were registered in 2006.

Transportation 
Altona-Nord is serviced by the rapid transit system of the city train with the stations Holstenstraße and Diebsteich.

According to the Department of Motor Vehicles (Kraftfahrt-Bundesamt), 5,682 private cars were registered in Altona-Nord (269 cars/1,000 people).

References

General sources 

 Statistical office Nord of Hamburg and Schleswig-Holstein, official website Statistisches Amt für Hamburg und Schleswig-Holstein

External links 

 Hamburg-Altona Local Newspaper, special Site of Altona-Nord

Quarters of Hamburg
Altona, Hamburg